The Arnhem trolleybus system is the trolleybus system in the city of Arnhem. It is unique in the Netherlands as the only trolleybus system still operating in that country.  It opened on 5 September 1949.

Active routes 
The current network consists of the following routes:
  1  De Laar West - Velp
  2  Centraal Station - De Laar West
  3  Burgers Zoo - Het Duifje
  5  Schuytgraaf - Presikhaaf
  6  Centraal Station - Elsweide/HAN
  7  Geitenkamp - Rijkerswoerd

Formerly, route  4  was part of the trolleybus network, but it became part of route 2 in 1950, after no more than four months of existence. The current line 4 in Arnhem is a CNG bus, but on a different route. The same goes for route  9 , which was discontinued in 2002 (divided between routes 5 and 7). The number 9, too, is now used on a different route in the CNG bus network. Route 7 is the second with this number, the first one being a rush hour line running on the central part of line 1.

Media

See also 
 British United Traction

References

External links 

  Trolleybuses in Arnhem

1949 establishments in the Netherlands
Arnhem
Trolleybus transport in the Netherlands
Transport in Gelderland
Arnhem